The Kiwi River is a river of New Zealand's South Island.

There are numerous other smaller watercourses in New Zealand called "Kiwi stream" or "Kiwi creek".

See also
List of rivers of New Zealand

References

Rivers of Canterbury, New Zealand
Rivers of New Zealand